Gilmer Bryan Morgan II, OD (born September 25, 1946) is an American professional golfer.

Morgan was born in Wewoka, Oklahoma. He graduated from East Central State College in Ada, Oklahoma in 1968. In 1972, Morgan earned a Doctor of Optometry degree from the Southern College of Optometry in Memphis, Tennessee before turning professional at golf later that year. He is a member of Sigma Tau Gamma fraternity.

Morgan won seven events on the PGA Tour between 1977 and 1990. He was also one of the most consistent top five finishers during this period. He posted 21 2nd place and 21 3rd place finishes on the PGA Tour in his career. The most prestigious tournament he won on the PGA Tour was the 1978 World Series of Golf. He also played on the 1979 and 1983 Ryder Cup teams.

Morgan was known for playing tournaments with little or no practice. He was exceptional at "playing cold".

Although he never won a major title during his time on the PGA Tour, Morgan showed signs of brilliance. For example, during the 1992 U.S. Open at Pebble Beach, Morgan became the first player to reach  10-under-par (−10) during U.S. Open competition when he recorded a birdie on the third hole during the third round. He later added two more birdies to reach −12 after the seventh hole. He would later finish badly to finish at −4. This was good enough for the 54-hole lead. However, a final round 81 left him +5, in a tie for 13th place  and eight shots behind eventual winner Tom Kite Morgan also led the 1976 PGA Championship after 36 holes but finished T8.

He became eligible to play on the Champions Tour in 1996. He has enjoyed much success on the Champion's Tour notching 25 wins. Three of his wins have come in senior majors, namely The Tradition in 1997 and 1998 and the Senior Players Championship in 1998.

Professional wins (41)

PGA Tour wins (7)

PGA Tour playoff record (3–4)

Japan Golf Tour wins (1)

Other wins (4)
1979 Heublein Open (Brazil)
1981 Oklahoma Open
1983 Jerry Ford Invitational (tie with Don Pooley)
1997 Oklahoma Open

Champions Tour wins (25)

*Note: The 2000 Comfort Classic was shortened to 36 holes due to rain.

Champions Tour playoff record (0–6)

Other senior wins (4)
1997 Diners Club Matches (with Jay Sigel)
1998 Senior Slam at Los Cabos,
1999 Senior Slam at Los Cabos, Liberty Mutual Legends of Golf (with Hubert Green)

Playoff record
European Tour playoff record (0–1)

Results in major championships

CUT = missed the half-way cut (3rd round cut in 1979 and 1982 Open Championships)
WD = withdrew
"T" = tied

Summary

Most consecutive cuts made – 7 (1982 PGA – 1984 Open Championship)
Longest streak of top-10s – 2 (twice)

Results in The Players Championship

CUT = missed the halfway cut
"T" indicates a tie for a place

Champions Tour major championships

Wins (3)

U.S. national team appearances
Professional
Ryder Cup: 1979 (winners), 1983 (winners)
Wendy's 3-Tour Challenge (representing Senior PGA Tour): 1998 (winners)

See also
1973 PGA Tour Qualifying School graduates
List of golfers with most PGA Tour wins
List of golfers with most PGA Tour Champions wins
List of golfers with most Champions Tour major championship wins

References

External links

American male golfers
PGA Tour golfers
PGA Tour Champions golfers
Ryder Cup competitors for the United States
Winners of senior major golf championships
Golfers from Oklahoma
American optometrists
East Central University alumni
People from Wewoka, Oklahoma
1946 births
Living people